Müşkülqazma (also, Mümgülqazma, Mükülqazma, Munyul’ and Myungyul’kazma) is a village in the Siazan Rayon of Azerbaijan.  The village forms part of the municipality of Sədan.

References 

Kaspi Newspaper

Populated places in Siyazan District